Kieran Murphy (born 1983) is an Irish hurler. His league and championship career with the Cork senior team spanned seven seasons from 2002 to 2008.

Born in Glounthaune, County Cork, Murphy first played competitive hurling and Gaelic football at Coláiste an Phiarsaigh. He simultaneously came to prominence at juvenile and underage levels with the Erin's Own club, before eventually becoming a dual player with the club's adult teams. Murphy won back-to-back county championship medals in 2006 and 2007.

Murphy made his debut on the inter-county scene when he was selected for the Cork minor teams as a dual player in 2000. He enjoyed two championship seasons with the minor teams, winning All-Ireland medals in both codes. Murphy subsequently joined both Cork under-21 teams, winning a Munster medal with the footballers in 2004. By this stage he had joined the Cork senior hurling team, making his debut during the 2002 league. Murphy enjoyed a number of successful seasons, culminating with the winning of an All-Ireland medal in 2005. He also won two Munster medals.

Honours

Erin's Own
Cork Senior Hurling Championship (1): 2006, 2007 (c)

Cork 
All-Ireland Senior Hurling Championship (1): 2005
Munster Senior Hurling Championship (2): 2005, 2006
Munster Under-21 Football Championship (1): 2004
All-Ireland Minor Hurling Championship (1): 2001
All-Ireland Minor Football Championship (1): 2000
Munster Minor Hurling Championship (1): 2000
Munster Minor Football Championship (1): 2000

References

1983 births
Living people
Hurling goalkeepers
Dual players
Erin's Own (Cork) hurlers
Erin's Own (Cork) Gaelic footballers
Cork inter-county hurlers
Cork inter-county Gaelic footballers